Totalmente Demais (English title: Total Dreamer) is a Brazilian telenovela produced and broadcast by TV Globo. It premiered on 9 November 2015 at the 7 pm timeslot, replacing I Love Paraisópolis and ended on 30 May 2016 hence, followed by Haja Coração.

Loosely based on the 1913 play Pygmalion by George Bernard Shaw, Totalmente Demais is written by Rosane Svartman and Paulo Halm in collaboration with Mário Viana, Claudia Sardinha, Fabrício Santiago and Felipe Cabral. The show is directed by Luiz Henrique Rios.

It stars Marina Ruy Barbosa, Felipe Simas, Fabio Assunção, Juliana Paes, Juliana Paiva, Humberto Martins,
Vivianne Pasmanter and Daniel Rocha.

In September 2017 Totalmente Demais was nominated in the 45th International Emmy Awards for best telenovela.

Production 

This is the first telenovela written by Rosane Svartman and Paulo Halm, authors of Malhação Sonhos and Malhação Intensa. It was previously titled as Poderosa then later A Dona do Jogo but later it was named Totalmente Demais to go at par with the theme song's title. Some scenes were recorded in Australia with Fábio Assunção, Juliana Paes, Humberto Martins, Vivianne Pasmanter, Marat Descartes and Fernanda Motta, with some of them being shot were recorded in Opera House, Botanical Garden, Bondi Beach, Quay Restaurant and Harbour Bridge. Initial scenes in Rio de Janeiro were recorded in Lapa, Benfica and Flamengo Park. The municipalities of Cachoeiras de Macacu and Guapimirim in Rio de Janeiro also served as shooting points for first scenes of Totalmente Demais. In April 2016, Marina Ruy Barbosa, Fábio Assunção, Juliana Paes and Daniel Rocha filmed scenes in Uruguay, in the cities of Punta del Este and Montevideo. One of the prominent themes in the story was the inclusion of Funk carioca but due to the repetition of the subject in other telenovelas, it was drastically reduced to avoid thematic clichés.

Casting and character development 
Casting was done by Eduardo Milewicz, Rossella Terranova and Maria Roberta Perez. To portray Carolina, Juliana Paes visited the publication chambers of the magazines Vogue and Marie Claire. [26] The telenovela had special appearance of Stênio Garcia as a truck driver Bino that aids Eliza (Marina Ruy Barbosa), leading her to Rio de Janeiro. Garcia also performed the same role in Carga Pesada. Carol Castro and Giovanna Ewbank also made a cameo appearances. Dira Paes was initially cast to portray Rosângela but due to her pregnancy, Malu Galli replaced her. André Arteche was formerly to play the photographer Fábio, but Daniel Rocha portrayed it instead but as Rafael, a character inspired by the French poet, Arthur Rimbaud. Sophia Abrahão auditioned for the role of the journalist Leila, but on realizing that she might not be among the protagonists, she turned down the offer and decided to dedicate her attention on her singing career. Carla Salle portrayed the role instead.

Plot 
Eliza is a young 18 year old who runs away from her house in Campo Claro, a fictitious city of the carioca interior, after being harassed by her stepfather Dino. She does not know her biological father and her mother, Gilda, always tells her he was a truck driver who spent most of his time on the road. Her dream is to find her father and help her family leave their difficult living situation. Her mother is married to Dino; the couple have two more children. When Eliza was a child, Dino treated her better, but this changed on the arrival of her half siblings. As soon as she arrives at Rio de Janeiro, she tries to pick up some money, but she is robbed. Without an option, Eliza starts living in the streets, and meets Jonatas, who sells bleats in the traffic lights of the Lapa to help his family and lives in the West zone of the Carioca Capital. She is also being threatened by Jacaré, an outlaw who is very feared and dangerous. She tries to gain money and starts to sell flowers in bars and restaurants. One day, she meets a businessman named Arthur, owner of Excalibur an modeling agency. He promises her that he will help her become a successful model. After a while, she accept his proposal. She is in turn employed in a company, where she will suffer persecutions from Carolina, a ruthless editor relaunching a style magazine who is extremely ambitious and in love with Arthur. He is a divorcee and has daughter named Maria João (Jojô). He falls madly in love with Eliza, which makes Carolina furious. On the other hand, there is Cassandra, who would do anything to become a successful model, and become rich, she allies with Carolina whose mission is to sabotage Arthur and Eliza's relationship.

Cast

Special participation

Soundtrack

Local songs 

Cover Fábio Assunção and Juliana Paes as Arthur and Carolina respectively.
Totalmente Demais National was released on 6 November 2015 three days before the premiere by Grupo Globo's Som Livre. It contains mainly Braziliantracks and sung by Brazilian artists tracks with variable genres.

Orchestra 

Totalmente Demais Orchestra was made available on 18 December 2015. It contains instrumental tracks produced by Rogério Vaz solely for the show.

International songs

Cover Fábio Assunção, Marina Ruy Barbosa and Felipe Simas as Arthur, Eliza and Jonatas respectively.
Totalmente Demais International was released on 4 March 2016 by Grupo Globo's Som Livre. It contains international tracks with variable genres.

Reception

Ratings 

On its premiere, Totalmente Demais registered a viewership rating of 25 points in Greater São Paulo according to consolidated data by Ibope thus registering lower indices to its predecessor I Love Paraisópolis which registered 29 points on its premiere. The show obtained viewership ratings of 25.8 and 26.4 points on 16 and 23 November 2015 respectively.
Its highest ratings in November 2015 was 28.3 points.

On 18 January 2016, on the premiere of Êta Mundo Bom!, the telenovela obtained its then new record 29.3 points in São Paulo.

On 22 February 2016, Totalmente Demais broke another record of 31 points in São Paulo. Based on the accumulated data the show registered better ratings since Cheias de Charme (2013).

On the episode aired on 28 April 2016, which had one of the key villains Sofia (Priscila Steinman) was killed off, the telenovela had its highest ratings since its premiere, obtaining 35 points in São Paulo and 39 points in Rio de Janeiro, becoming the best time mark since July 16, 2012.

On the penultimate episode, the show obtained 30.8 points in Greater São Paulo, highest viewership rating since Morde & Assopra (2011).

The telenovela came to an end reaching more than 39 million viewers, 41 rating points and a 58% share in Brazil. This is the highest viewership since Ti Ti Ti (2010) in the 2010s decade. Also, for the first time in Globo’s history, a telenovela's final episode was broadcast on a Monday instead of the network’s traditional Friday release.  Cumulatively, Totalmente Demais obtained an average of 27.4 points.

This telenovela will now be broadcast for the first time in India on Zindagi from 10 April 2017, dubbed in Hindi, under the title Total Dreamer. It will be the first Brazilian series of the network.

The series starts in Bulgaria on 6 November 2017 at 20:00 on bTV Lady.

UniMás, the sister station of Univision, aired the series beginning 13 June 2017, replacing Los Diez Mandamientos. It is dubbed in Spanish under the title Totalmente Diva.

In Greece, it was aired on Alpha TV for a week from January 21, 2019 to January 25, 2019, under the title Total Dreamer, but was cut due to low television viewing. However, starting July 1, 2019, the series will be re-viewed on the same channel.

Awards and nominations

References

External links 
  
 

2015 telenovelas
TV Globo telenovelas
Brazilian telenovelas
2015 Brazilian television series debuts
2016 Brazilian television series endings
Television shows set in Sydney
Television shows set in Rio de Janeiro (city)
Brazilian LGBT-related television shows
Portuguese-language telenovelas